Birkett Kealy "Kett" Turton (born April 4, 1982) is an American-born Canadian film and television actor who had a starring role in the television series Dead Last (2001). Turton was also featured in the television series Millennium (1997), Honey, I Shrunk the Kids: The TV Show (2001), Smallville (2002), Dark Angel (2002), The Dead Zone (2002), Dead Like Me (2003), 24 (2003), Supernatural (2005), Fringe (2012), Gotham (2014), The Flash (2015), Blue Bloods (2015), Deadbeat (2015), Jessica Jones (2015), iZombie (2017), The Magicians (2018), and Riverdale (2020).

Biography
Turton was born in Portland, Oregon, United States, and raised in Vancouver, British Columbia, Canada. He started acting in local theater performances when he was 4 years old. At the age of 15, he played the role of Darrin in the Canadian movie Rollercoaster, for which he was nominated for Canada's prestigious Leo Award.

Since then, Turton has had various roles in both television and film. Most notable are his major roles in television series Dead Last, television mini-series Kingdom Hospital and film Gypsy 83. In Gypsy 83 he played the role of Clive, a gay, goth teen coming of age, alongside Sara Rue. This role earned him the Best Actor Award at Outfest, an LGBT film festival. From 2006–2009 he completed a BA in Acting at the Royal Academy of Dramatic Art (RADA).

Filmography

Video games 
 Spider-Man (2000) – Bank Thug Pilot (voice, in cut scene, uncredited)

Theatre
 2009 – Molière, or The League of Hypocrites (Finborough Theatre)

Awards
 Nominated for Canadian Leo - Best Actor (Rollercoaster)
 Won Copper Wing Award (at the Phoenix Film Festival) - Best Ensemble (Rollercoaster)
 Won Grand Jury Award (at OUTfest) - Best Actor Award (Gypsy 83)

References

External links
 

1982 births
Male actors from Portland, Oregon
Male actors from Vancouver
Canadian male film actors
Canadian male television actors
Canadian male voice actors
Living people
Alumni of RADA